John F. McKeon (born June 3, 1958) is an American Democratic Party politician, who has served in the New Jersey General Assembly since 2002, where he represents the 27th Legislative District, which covers the western portion of Essex County. He has served in the Assembly as a Deputy Speaker (2010–11), Majority Whip (2008–09), Assistant Majority Leader (2006–07) and Assistant Majority Whip (2004–05), and has been the Assembly's Parliamentarian since 2022. He is also a former mayor of the Township of West Orange.

Biography
Born in Montclair, New Jersey on June 3, 1958, McKeon was raised in Orange and West Orange. He is a graduate of West Orange Mountain High School.

McKeon received a B.A. in 1980 from Muhlenberg College cum laude in history and was awarded a J.D. in 1983 from the Seton Hall University School of Law. At graduation, he was the recipient of the Peter Rodino Law Society Outstanding Student Award. He then served as judicial clerk to Joseph M. Thuring, Superior Court of New Jersey, Hudson County and as a legislative aide to Representative Joseph Minish. McKeon is a former legislative counsel to Senator Richard Codey and counsel to the West Orange Board of Adjustment.

He is a senior partner at Hardin, Kundla, McKeon, Poletto and Polifroni, a law firm in Springfield Township. He is married to Ann Mader McKeon, also an attorney at the same firm, and has three daughters.

Political career
McKeon had served on the Township of West Orange Council from 1992 to 1998 as the Mayor of West Orange from 1998 to 2010. From the time that he took office in the Assembly in 2002 until he left his position as mayor in June 2010, he simultaneously held a seat in the New Jersey General Assembly and was West Orange Mayor. This dual position, often called double dipping, was allowed under a grandfather clause in the state law enacted by the New Jersey Legislature and signed into law by Governor of New Jersey Jon Corzine in September 2007 that prevents dual-office-holding but allows those who had held both positions as of February 1, 2008, to retain both posts. On July 1, 2010, Robert Parisi took over the mayoral position.

New Jersey General Assembly
During his first term in the Legislature, McKeon was the prime sponsor of the Assembly version of the laws requiring school districts to adopt anti-harassment policies, strengthening school bus driver background checks and revising the State's laws concerning the release of wild animals, and was a prime sponsor of the Patients First Medical Malpractice Insurance reform legislation.

Other leadership positions McKeon has held during his tenure in the Assembly include Assistant Majority Whip from 2004 to 2005, Assistant Majority Leader from 2006 to 2007, Majority Whip in 2008 and 2009, and Deputy Speaker from 2010 to 2011. John McKeon was one of the 11 sponsors of the "New Jersey Insurance Marketplace Preservation Act" also known as bill A3380 which enacts the shared responsibility penalty in state income tax.

Committees 
Committee assignments for the current session are:
Financial Institutions and Insurance, as Chair
Budget
Environment and Solid Waste
Judiciary

District 27 
Each of the 40 districts in the New Jersey Legislature has one representative in the New Jersey Senate and two members in the New Jersey General Assembly. The representatives from the 27th District for the 2022—23 Legislative Session are:
Senator Richard Codey (D) 
Assemblyman John F. McKeon (D) 
Assemblywoman Mila Jasey (D)

References

External links
Assemblyman John McKeon's Official Website
Assemblyman McKeon's legislative web page, New Jersey Legislature
New Jersey Legislature financial disclosure forms
2016 2015  2014 2013 2012 2011  2010 2009 2008 2007 2006 2005 2004
 West Orange, New Jersey: Office of the Mayor	
Assembly Member John F. McKeon, Project Vote Smart
New Jersey Voter Information Website 2003

1958 births
21st-century American politicians
Living people
Mayors of places in New Jersey
Muhlenberg College alumni
New Jersey city council members
Democratic Party members of the New Jersey General Assembly
New Jersey lawyers
People from Montclair, New Jersey
People from Orange, New Jersey
People from West Orange, New Jersey
Politicians from Essex County, New Jersey
Seton Hall University School of Law alumni
West Orange High School (New Jersey) alumni